Per Alex Jensen, known as Per Jensen for short (born 10 December 1930) is a Danish former football (soccer) player. He started his career as an amateur player with Kjøbenhavns Boldklub (KB) and was the top goalscorer of the 1959 Danish football championship. He moved abroad to play professionally for AS Saint-Etienne in France and Italian club US Triestina, before ending his career back with KB. He played two games and scored two goals for the Denmark national football team in 1952.

References

External links
Danish national team profile
Roberto Di Maggio, Danish Players in Italy, RSSSF, January 2, 2005
Haslund profile

1930 births
Living people
Danish men's footballers
Kjøbenhavns Boldklub players
AS Saint-Étienne players
U.S. Triestina Calcio 1918 players
Denmark international footballers
Danish expatriate men's footballers
Expatriate footballers in Italy
Expatriate footballers in France
Serie A players
Association football forwards
Footballers from Copenhagen
Danish expatriate sportspeople in France
Danish expatriate sportspeople in Italy